The governor of the Department of Sucre heads the executive branch of the government of the Sucre Department in Colombia. The governor is the highest-ranking official in the department and is elected by popular vote. The current governor is Hector Olimpo Espinosa.

Qualifications
The elected governor of Córdoba is required to be a citizen of Colombia or be naturalized; to be at least 18 years old; and not hold another political office at the time of the election.

See also 

 Governor of Córdoba

References